Ablade Glover   CV (born 1934) is a Ghanaian artist and educator. He has exhibited widely, building an international reputation over several decades, as well as being regarded as a seminal figure on the West African art scene. His work is held in many prestigious private and public collections, which include the Imperial Palace of Japan, the UNESCO headquarters in Paris and Chicago's O'Hare International Airport. He has received several national and international awards, including the Order of the Volta in Ghana, and is a Life Fellow of the Royal Society of Arts, London. He was Associate Professor, Head of the Department of Art Education and Dean of the College of Art at the Kwame Nkrumah University of Science and Technology until 1994.

Early life and education
Born in the La community of Accra in what was then the Gold Coast (present-day Ghana), Emmanuel Ablade Glover had his early education at Presbyterian mission schools. He had his teacher training education at the Kwame Nkrumah University of Science and Technology, Kumasi (1957–58), before winning a scholarship to study textile design at London's Central School of Art and Design (1959–62).

Glover returned to Ghana to teach for a while, before another scholarship, given by Kwame Nkrumah, enabled Glover to study art education at the University of Newcastle upon Tyne (1964–65), where he began to use the tool that shaped his technique when his teacher suggested a palette knife to apply paint, rather than brushes. Glover went on to further his education in the US, first at Kent State University, where he earned his master's degree, and then at Ohio State University where he was awarded a PhD in 1974.

Career

Academic 
Returning to Ghana after receiving his doctorate, Glover taught for the next two decades at the College of Art in the University of Kumasi, becoming Department Head and College Dean. He rose to the rank of an associate professor within that period.

Artists Alliance Gallery 
He founded the Accra-based Artists Alliance Gallery, which has roots in an earlier gallery he founded in the 1960s and in its new incarnation was opened by Kofi Annan in 2008. As well as being an outlet for Glover's own work, this gallery features the work of other significant artists such as Owusu-Ankomah and George O. Hughes, together with collectible local artifacts.

Style
Glover's style has been described as "swirling between abstraction and realism", and his subject matter typically favours large urban landscapes, lorryparks, shantytowns, thronging markets and studies of the women of Ghana. Asked about his influences, he has said: "...if you notice, you see a lot of women in my work and people do ask me, why do you paint so many women? The first time I was asked the question, I didn't think about it. I just opened my mouth and said because they are more beautiful than men. That wasn't a serious answer. It was later, thinking about it, that it struck me they have courage. Women of Africa have some courage and they show it. When they walk the street, they are elegant. They are courageous, they are brave. When they are going about, they show it. Men don't do that, do they?"

Honours and recognition 
In 1998, Glover received the Flagstar Award by ACRAG (the Arts Critics and Reviewers Association of Ghana), and was also honoured with the distinguished alumni award from the African-American Institute in New York City.  He has received several national and international awards, including the Order of the Volta in Ghana in 2007, the Millennium Excellence Award in 2010 and is a Life Fellow of the Royal Society of Arts, London. He is also a Fellow of the Ghana Academy of Arts and Sciences.

Selected exhibitions

 Ablade Glover: 80th Anniversary, October Gallery, London (3 July–2 August 2014)
 Transmission Part 2, Tasneem Gallery, Barcelona, Spain (15 November 2012 – 30 March 2013)
 I See You, Tasneem Gallery (6 July–17 November 2010)
 Ablade Glover: 75 Year Anniversary, October Gallery, London (2 July–1 August 2009)
 Visions & Dreams, Tasneem Gallery (13 March–31 May 2008)

See also 
 Owusu-Ankomah
 George O. Hughes

References

External links 

 Ablade Glover: The unsung Heroines of Africa’s Modern Art History
 UNESCO works of art collection: Glover, Ablade PEOPLESCAPE, 1991 
 October Gallery : Ablade Glover
 Art network : Collection of Ablade Glover
 Artsy Artworks : Bio,Collection of Ablade Glover 
 Ablade Glover on Ghana’s Art Scene and His Own Pioneering Work by Adriana La Lime
 Louis Simone Guirandou Gallery : Ablade Glover (Bio, Works)
 Works of Ablade Glover

1934 births
20th-century Ghanaian painters
20th-century male artists
21st-century Ghanaian painters
21st-century male artists
Alumni of the Central School of Art and Design
Fellows of the Ghana Academy of Arts and Sciences
Ghanaian artists
Ghanaian educators
Ghanaian male artists
Kwame Nkrumah University of Science and Technology alumni
Academic staff of Kwame Nkrumah University of Science and Technology
Living people
Male painters
People from Accra
Recipients of the Order of the Volta